Eva Doležalová (born May 5, 1991) is a award-winning Czech director, screenwriter, and producer. She speaks English, French, Czech, Italian, Polish, and Spanish. Doležalová is signed with Ridley Scott’s Creative Group.

In 2021, Doležalová was named in Forbes' prestigious 30 Under 30 feature.

Early life
At the age of 10, Eva Doležalová began acting in Czech films and theatrical productions as an actress and co-writer of plays. 
At 18, she moved to London to study acting at the Royal Academy of Dramatic Art. At that time, Eva worked on films with well-known directors such as Shane Black or Mike Figgis with whom she co-wrote and camera-operated a film Kudelksi.

After completing her studies, Eva moved to Paris where she began to find her own artistic voice and realized her long-time dream for filmmaking, and started pursuing her writing and directing skills.

Career

Eva moved to Los Angeles in 2016, where she quickly completed her first short film, Sound of Sun, starring Sean Penn and Suki Waterhouse, released by NOWNESS. The film met with critical acclaim within the industry. Since then, Doležalová directed multiple commercials and short films such as Carte Blanche (Amazon release), starring Dylan Sprouse, Suki Waterhouse and Jack Kilmer for which she's received an Audience Award at the  Mammoth Film Festival in 2019, and a Breakout Director Award in Capri Hollywood Film Festival in 2020.

Doležalová also earned the Best Director's Award (2021) for Maestro starring Clara McGregor and Karel Dobry at Independent Shorts Awards USA and Jury Prize for Best Drama.

In 2022 Doležalová directed Serpentine, a body-horror genre short film with Bulgari as the Official Partner and Sponsor, starring Barbara Palvin, Luke Brandon Field, and Soo Joo Park for which Doležalová earned Best Genre Short Film at Mammoth Film Festival in 2022.

From her newest work can be also seen Raven (2021) a poetic sci-fi short film about the end of the world and beginning of a new one. Portraying Ravens the engineered executioners that  were designed to rid humankind of its very nature - humans.

Centre Pompidou Foundation in Paris screened Eva's trilogy of Transformational Shorts: Sound of Sun, Somnio, and Samice which was awarded by 7000 Art Company, France.

Doležalová is in the development of her first feature film with Wild Bunch Distribution and Vixens Films.

Filmography

Awards and recognitions

Awards

Recognitions
2019 - Recognition Award for Transformational Trilogy: Sound of Sun, Somnio, and Samice screened at the Centre Pompidou Foundation, Paris
2019 - Recognition Award for Philanthropy work with White Ribbon foundation against domestic violence towards women and children

References

External links
 
 Eva Doležalová's Facebook Page

Czech film actresses
Czech stage actresses
Living people
21st-century Czech actresses
1991 births